Ashley Carroll (born November 24, 1994) is an American sport shooter.

She participated at the 2018 ISSF World Shooting Championships, winning a medal.

References

External links

Living people
1994 births
American female sport shooters
Trap and double trap shooters
Sportspeople from Santa Barbara, California
Pan American Games medalists in shooting
Pan American Games gold medalists for the United States
Shooters at the 2019 Pan American Games
Medalists at the 2019 Pan American Games
21st-century American women
20th-century American women